Iris is a genus of praying mantis found in Africa, Asia, and Southern Europe with one species, Iris oratoria, being introduced to North America in the south-western United States.

Species
The following species are recognised in the genus Iris:
Iris caeca
Iris deserti
Iris insolita
Iris nana
Iris narzykulovi
Iris oratoria (Mediterranean mantis)
Iris orientalis
Iris persa
Iris persiminima
Iris pitcheri
Iris polystictica
Iris senegalensis
Iris splendida
Iris strigosa

See also
List of mantis genera and species

References

Tarachodidae
Insects of Africa
Mantodea genera
Taxa named by Henri Louis Frédéric de Saussure